William Joseph Wright (26 October 1952 13 November 2021) was the eighth bishop of the Roman Catholic Diocese of Maitland-Newcastle in Australia. He was consecrated on 15 June 2011.

Cardinal George Pell, two dozen priests, bishops and hundreds of parishioners packed the Sacred Heart Cathedral in Hamilton, New South Wales, for his consecration as bishop.

On 15 September 2021, Wright announced that he had submitted his resignation to Pope Francis on the grounds of ill health. He died of terminal lung cancer on 13 November 2021.

Life and career
Wright was born on 26 October 1952 in Washington DC, shortly before his family returned to Australia. He went to school at St Aloysius' College in Sydney and Wimbledon College in London, England. His studies for the priesthood were at St Columba's College in Springwood  and St Patrick's College in Manly. He later took his BA (Hons) at Sydney University. Wright was ordained a deacon in 1976 and to the priesthood in 1977.

As a priest, he served the parishes of Stanmore, Mount Druitt, Fairfield, Enmore, Dulwich Hill, Bonnyrigg, Moree, Sutherland and Liverpool. He was vice-rector of St Patrick's College in Manly (1985–1991) and assistant secretary to the Australian Catholic Bishops Conference in Canberra in 1995.

Wright was ordained as Bishop of Maitland-Newcastle on 15 June 2011. As a bishop, he served as the co-chair of the National Committee for Professional Standards. He served on the Truth Justice and Healing Council as well as several Australian bishops' commissions, including Church Ministry, Ecumenism and Inter-Religious Relations, Evangelization, Laity, and Ministry, and Social Justice, Mission and Service. He was also Chair of the Bishops Commission for Professional Standards and Safeguarding.

In September 2021, Wright submitted his resignation to Pope Francis due to illness with lung cancer. He died on 13 November 2021 at Maitland Hospital.

References

External links

 

1952 births
2021 deaths
American expatriates in Australia
Bishops appointed by Pope Benedict XVI
Roman Catholic bishops of Maitland-Newcastle
Deaths from lung cancer
Deaths from cancer in Australia
Religious leaders from Washington, D.C.